Frisian Americans are Americans with full or partial Frisian ancestry.

Frisians are a Germanic ethnic group native to the coastal parts of the Netherlands and Germany. They are closely related to the Dutch, Northern Germans, and the English and speak Frisian languages divided by geographical regions. The Old Frisian language was once the closest Germanic language to Old English, though outside influences (from Dutch on Frisian and from Norman French on English) have made both languages grow ever farther apart than they naturally would have as they were developing separately.

Today there exists a tripartite division of the original Frisians; namely the North Frisians, East Frisians and West Frisian, caused by the Frisia's constant loss of territory in the Middle Ages, but the West Frisians in the general do not feel or see themselves as part of a larger group of Frisians, and, according to a 1970 inquiry, identify themselves more with the Dutch than with East or North Frisians. Therefore the moniker 'Frisian' is (when used for the speakers of all three Frisian language) a linguistic (and to some extent, cultural) concept, not a political one.

Because there is no modern united Frisian state, Frisian Americans are often included within Dutch Americans, German Americans or Scandinavian Americans.

History 
In the New Netherland colony, Frisian people from North Frisia, East Frisia and West Friesland were the largest ethnic group in the city of New Amsterdam which later became New York City. The New Amsterdam area was chiefly explored by one Jonas Bronk who led a group of settlers from North Frisia, and the region was later named The Bronx after him. Bronk (also known as Bronck) himself is said to have been either Danish or Swedish. Many North-Frisian settlers were refugees of the Burchardi flood of 1634 which had destroyed the wealthy island of Strand. According to Paulsen, "they introduced their old democratic traditions into the patrician Dutch society of that time."

Notable people

Icko Iben - Astrophysicist and distinguished Professor Emeritus at the University of Illinois

East Frisian Origin
Pieter Claesen Wyckoff, born in Norden
Minnie Marx, born in Dornum
Marx Brothers - comedians
Friedrich Diercks - pioneer settler in Texas, born in Gödens
Wolfgang Petersen - film director, born in Emden
Theodore Thomas - first music director of the Chicago Symphony Orchestra, born in Esens
Al Shean - comedian, born in Dornum
Karsten Schwan - computer pioneer, born in Oldenburg
Ub Iwerks - animator

North Frisian origin
Cornelius Jensen – pioneer settler in the Inland Empire (California)
Ludwig Nissen – gemstone dealer and philanthropist, born in Husum

West Frisian origin
 Dan Bylsma – Pittsburgh Penguins head coach
 Bridget Fonda - actress
 Henry Fonda - actor
 Jane Fonda - actress
 Peter Fonda - actor
 William K. Frankena – moral philosopher
 Anna-Marie Goddard - nude model and Playboy Playmate
 Rod Jellema – poet, teacher and translator
 Frederick Manfred - novelist
 Jack R. Lousma - astronaut
 David Pietersz. de Vries – founder of New Amsterdam
 David Petraeus
 Alvin Plantinga – philosopher
 Kyrsten Sinema - politician
 Peter Stuyvesant – Director-General of New Netherland
 Sam Peckinpah, film director
 Geerhardus Vos – Frisian-born theologian, professor of biblical theology at Princeton Theological Seminary.

Fictional Frisian Americans
 Rip Van Winkle

Notes

References

Further reading
 "Frisians" in Stephan Thernstrom, ed. Harvard Encyclopedia of American Ethnic Groups (1980), 401–403. comprehensive survey
 ten Hoor, Marten. "Frisians in the United States" Michigan Alumnus Quarterly Review 58#10 (1951) :50-56 online

 
European-American society
Frisian diaspora